Charles O'Niellan (some sources O’Mellan) was appointed Dean of Armagh in 1443 and served until 1475.

References

Deans of Armagh
15th-century Irish Roman Catholic priests